Washington Park is a neighborhood in Richmond, Virginia's North Side. The neighborhood lies west of the Forest Lawn Cemetery and the Richmond International Raceway.

External links 
 Washington Park boundaries

Neighborhoods in Richmond, Virginia